Tangents is an Australian band, currently signed to Temporary Residence Limited. Their music incorporates elements of jazz, free improvisation, post-rock, and electronic music.

Tangents was founded in 2010, and the group released its first album, I, in 2013; the record was produced by Chicago-based producer Casey Rice. After touring with Mono in 2015, they signed with Temporary Residence and released their second album Stateless with the label in mid-2016. While I was largely recorded live in the studio, Stateless was put together from improvisations that were digitally manipulated and then put together.

In 2018, the group released a third album, New Bodies.<ref>[https://pitchfork.com/reviews/albums/tangents-new-bodies/ New Bodies review], Pitchfork Media</ref>

Members
Adrian Lim-Klumpes - keyboards, marimba, vibraphone
Ollie Brown - electronic instruments
Peter Hollo - cello
Evan Dorrian - drums
Shoeb Ahmad - guitar

DiscographyI (Heliosquare Recordings, 2013)Stateless (Temporary Residence, 2016)New Bodies (Temporary Residence, 2018)Stents + Arteries EP (Temporary Residence, 2018)Timeslips'' (Temporary Residence, 2020)

References

Australian rock music groups
Temporary Residence Limited artists